Ekaterina Makarova and Elena Vesnina were the defending champions, but Makarova withdrew due to injury.  Vesnina partnered up with Daniela Hantuchová, but they retired in the quarterfinals due to Hantuchová's injury.
Svetlana Kuznetsova and Samantha Stosur won the title, defeating Alla Kudryavtseva and Anastasia Rodionova in the final, 6–1, 1–6, [10–8].

Seeds

Draw

Draw

References
 Main Draw

2013 Women's Doubles
Kremlin Cup - Doubles